Khriehu Liezietsu is an Indian politician and MLA of the Nagaland Legislative Assembly and is the Parliament Secretary for Youth Resources and Sports, State Lotteries and Music Task Force in Nagaland Government. He belongs to Naga People's Front Party and has won the election from Northern Angami I Assembly constituency.

References

People from Kohima
Naga People's Front politicians
Nagaland MLAs 2013–2018
Living people
Year of birth missing (living people)